Thelymitra viridis, commonly called the green sun orchid, is a species of orchid that is endemic to Tasmania. It has a single erect, fleshy, channelled leaf and up to seven small self-pollinating pale blue to pale purplish flowers. The rest of the plant is a pale green colour.

Description
The lobe on the top of the anther is usually yellowish, tube-shaped and gently curved with a small notch. The side lobes curve upwards and have mop-like tufts of white hairs. Flowering occurs in October and November but the flowers are self-pollinating and only open on hot days.

Taxonomy and naming
Thelymitra viridis was first formally described in 2004 by Jeff Jeanes and the description was published in Muelleria from a specimen collected in the Rocky Cape National Park. The specific epithet (viridis) is a Latin word meaning "green", referring to the overall pale greenish colour of this orchid.

Distribution and habitat
The green sun orchid grows in heath, near swamps and near rocks in coastal Tasmania.

References

External links
 

viridis
Endemic orchids of Australia
Orchids of Tasmania
Plants described in 2004